Esterházy is a Hungarian surname.

Esterházy may also refer to:
 House of Esterházy, a Hungarian noble family
 Esterhazy, Saskatchewan, a town in Canada
 Schloss Esterházy, a palace in Eisenstadt, Austria
 Palais Esterházy, a baroque palace in Vienna, Austria
 Esterházy torte, a Hungarian cake named after a member of the Esterházy dynasty

See also
 Esterhazy Quartet, a string quartet
 Ferdinand Walsin Esterhazy, French army officer